In Greek mythology, Minyas (Ancient Greek: Μινύας) was the founder of Orchomenus, Boeotia.

Family 
As the ancestor of the Minyans, a number of Boeotian genealogies lead back to him, according to the classicist H.J. Rose. Accounts vary as to his own parentage: one source stated that he was thought to be the son of Orchomenus and Hermippe, his real father being Poseidon; in another account he was called the son of the latter and Callirhoe or Tritogeneia, daughter of Aeolus or Euryanassa, daughter of Hyperphas or lastly, Chrysogone, daughter of Almus. Yet others variously gave Minyas' father as Chryses (son of Poseidon and Chrysogeneia),  Thessalus (son of Poseidon), Eteocles, Sisyphus, Aeolus, Ares, Aleus and Halmus (Almus).

Minyas was married to Euryale, Clytodora, or Phanosyra (daughter of Paeon). Of them, Clytodora bore him a daughter Clymene (also called Periclymene, mother of Iphiclus and Alcimede by Phylacus or Cephalus). Clytodora was also given as the mother by Minyas of Orchomenus, Presbon, Athamas, Diochthondas and Eteoclymene. Minyas' other children include Cyparissus, the founder of Anticyra, and three daughters known as the Minyades who were turned into bats. In some accounts, Minyas was also said to be the father of Persephone, mother of Iasus. The latter was the father of Amphion, who in turn was the father of Chloris and Phylomache, respectively the wives of Neleus and Pelias. Also, Elara, the mother of the giant Tityus was also described sometimes as Minyas' daughter.

Mythology 
According to Apollonius Rhodius and Pausanias, Minyas was the first king to have made a treasury, of which the ruins were still extant in Pausanias' times.

See also
 Graïke
 Graia
 Persephone
 Chloris

Notes

References 

 Antoninus Liberalis, The Metamorphoses of Antoninus Liberalis translated by Francis Celoria (Routledge 1992). Online version at the Topos Text Project.
 Apollonius Rhodius, Argonautica translated by Robert Cooper Seaton (1853-1915), R. C. Loeb Classical Library Volume 001. London, William Heinemann Ltd, 1912. Online version at the Topos Text Project.
 Apollonius Rhodius, Argonautica. George W. Mooney. London. Longmans, Green. 1912. Greek text available at the Perseus Digital Library.
 Gaius Julius Hyginus, Fabulae from The Myths of Hyginus translated and edited by Mary Grant. University of Kansas Publications in Humanistic Studies. Online version at the Topos Text Project.
 Lucius Mestrius Plutarchus, Moralia with an English Translation by Frank Cole Babbitt. Cambridge, MA. Harvard University Press. London. William Heinemann Ltd. 1936. Online version at the Perseus Digital Library. Greek text available from the same website.
 Pausanias, Description of Greece with an English Translation by W.H.S. Jones, Litt.D., and H.A. Ormerod, M.A., in 4 Volumes. Cambridge, MA, Harvard University Press; London, William Heinemann Ltd. 1918. . Online version at the Perseus Digital Library
 Pausanias, Graeciae Descriptio. 3 vols. Leipzig, Teubner. 1903.  Greek text available at the Perseus Digital Library
 Publius Ovidius Naso, Metamorphoses translated by Brookes More (1859-1942). Boston, Cornhill Publishing Co. 1922. Online version at the Perseus Digital Library.
 Publius Ovidius Naso, Metamorphoses. Hugo Magnus. Gotha (Germany). Friedr. Andr. Perthes. 1892. Latin text available at the Perseus Digital Library.
Fowler, R. L. (2000), Early Greek Mythography: Volume 1: Text and Introduction, Oxford University Press, 2000. .
Smith, William. Dictionary of Greek and Roman Biography and Mythology, v. 2, page 1092

Kings of Minyan Orchomenus
Kings in Greek mythology
Children of Poseidon
Demigods in classical mythology
Minyan characters in Greek mythology